Catch It Keep It is an American game show and reality television series hosted by Zach Selwyn and Mike Senese.  It was broadcast on the Science Channel and premiered on July 17, 2009.  In each episode a three-member team had 48 hours to build a contraption that would save their prize from destruction.

Premise
At the beginning of the competition, Mike Senese, the "Engineer of Destruction", demonstrated how he would attempt to destroy the prize.  The team was then given one hour to plan before spending the remaining time on construction. At checkpoints before the deadline, the design's integrity could be tested. The team won if the contraption passed all tests and prevented Senese from destroying the prize.

On some episodes, Senese would work concurrently on his own design to save the prize, typically using a different approach than the team. If the team failed the prize would be set up again for Senese to attempt his method. However, if Senese's design also failed, the prize was awarded to the team.

See also
 Scrapheap Challenge

References

External links
 
 Interview of show's hosts at Wired.com

2000s American reality television series
2000s American game shows
2009 American television series debuts
Science Channel original programming